The 2019 Murray State Racers football team represented Murray State University in the 2019 NCAA Division I FCS football season. They were led by fifth-year head coach Mitch Stewart and played their home games at Roy Stewart Stadium. They were members of the Ohio Valley Conference. They finished the season 4–8, 2–6 in OVC play to finish in a tie for seventh place. Stewart was reassigned to a new position within the athletic department following the season, he finished with a record of 19–37.

Previous season

The Racers finished the 2018 season 5–6, 5–3 in OVC play to finish in fourth place.

Preseason

Preseason coaches' poll
The OVC released their preseason coaches' poll on July 22, 2019. The Racers were picked to finish in seventh place.

Preseason All-OVC team
The Racers had three players selected to the preseason all-OVC team.

Special teams

Gabriel Vicente – K

Steve Dawson – P

Malik Honeycutt – RS

Schedule

Game summaries

Pikeville

Week 2: at #3 Georgia

at Toledo

Morehead State

at UT Martin

Eastern Illinois

at Tennessee State

Eastern Kentucky

at Jacksonville State

Tennessee Tech

Austin Peay

at Southeast Missouri State

References

Murray State
Murray State Racers football seasons
Murray State Racers football